Govind Sadashiv Tembe, popularly known as Govindrao Tembe (5 June 1881 – 9 October 1955), was a harmonium player, stage actor, and music composer.

Early life and background
He grew up in Kolhapur and became attached to music early in life. He was largely self-taught as an harmonium player. He has acknowledged the debt of Deval Club for his initial forays into Hindustani classical music.

Tembe learnt his art from Bhaskarbuwa Bakhale and, although he never received direct guidance from Alladiya Khan of Jaipur Gharana, Tembe considered Khansaheb as his guru.

Career
He used to accompany Pt. Bhaskarbuwa Bakhale, and would also often perform solo, but later gave up harmonium for most part of his career.

He composed music for the drama Manapman in 1910, and also for the first Marathi talkie Ayodhyecha Raja (1932). He also acted in both these productions.

He was a personal friend of Late Yuvaraja of Mysore, HH Sri. Kanteerva Narasimha Raja Wadiyar. Prof. Tembe was part of a large entourage of Yuvaraja during his trip to Europe in 1939. The Troupe performed before the Pope and at other places during this trip. As World war broke out, they stayed at London for a long time and ultimately returned in Jan 1940 but Yuvaraja died soon at his Palace Anchorage (next to Hotel Taj) in March 1940 and Prof. Tembe lost his patron.
 
He was part-owner of Gandharva Natak Mandali when it was formed in 1913. Two years later, he started his own company named Shivraj Natak Mandali. He wrote dramas and also the padas (songs) in them.

Further reading
 "Between Two Tanpuras" by Vamanrao H Deshpande  
 Book by Vasant Shantaram Desai 'Years of Glory', The Marathi Theatre: 1843-1960 (Bombay, 1961)
 In Marathi: 'सांस्कृतिक महाराष्ट्राचे शिल्पकार : गोविंदराव  टेंबे', 2006 लेखक: डॉ. सौ. चारुशीला दिवेकर ("Sanskritik Maharashtrache Shilpkar : Govindrao Tembe", 2006 by Charusheela Divekar)

References

External links
 
 Website of Prabhat Films
 Prabhat Film Company

Hindustani instrumentalists
Hindustani singers
Indian male stage actors
Marathi-language writers
Indian male dramatists and playwrights
1881 births
1955 deaths
Male actors in Marathi cinema
People from Kolhapur
Harmonium players
Marathi-language singers
Male actors in Marathi theatre
Indian male musical theatre actors
Hindustani composers
20th-century Indian dramatists and playwrights
Male actors from Gujarat
Musicians from Maharashtra
20th-century Indian male writers
20th-century organists
Indian male film score composers
20th-century Indian male singers
20th-century Indian singers
Jaipur gharana